The Drums of Asia is a 1921 German silent film directed by Uwe Jens Krafft and starring Rudolf Lettinger, Käthe Haack and Arnold Marlé.

It was shot at the Emelka Studios in Munich. The film's sets were designed by the art director Willy Reiber.

Cast
 Rudolf Lettinger as van Daalen
 Käthe Haack
 Arnold Marlé
 Hans Carl Mueller as Pastor Zurbinden
 Olga Biedermann
 Mary Thomas
 Heinrich Schroth as Hopkins
 Vladimir Agayev
 Erner Huebsch

References

Bibliography
 Bock, Hans-Michael & Bergfelder, Tim. The Concise CineGraph. Encyclopedia of German Cinema. Berghahn Books, 2009.
 Kristin Thompson. Herr Lubitsch Goes to Hollywood: German and American Film After World War I. Amsterdam University Press, 2005.

External links

1921 films
Films of the Weimar Republic
German silent feature films
Films directed by Uwe Jens Krafft
German black-and-white films
Films shot at Bavaria Studios
Bavaria Film films
1920s German films